23rd Ranger Division is a Takavar  division of the Ground Forces of Islamic Republic of Iran Army based in Parandak, Tehran Province.

During the Iran–Iraq War, the division was mainly engaged in fighting on the Northern front including around Sardasht, West Azerbaijan in order to prevent Iraqi Army forces from concentrating on the Southern front.

References 

Special forces of Iran
Takavar Divisions of Ground Forces of Islamic Republic of Iran Army
Robat Karim County